In 1996, Youth Pastor Bill O'Boyle moved to town and put together a band to play for youth group on Wednesday nights. He added a couple of brothers from New York, Christopher and Owen Thomas, and together they formed a Christian pop/rock group they named Just Visiting along with bass guitarist Jess Sutton. In the early days Bill wrote all the music and Owen Thomas wrote most of the lyrics.  Owen Thomas did the primary vocals, and played Sax. Christopher Thomas added drums, percussion.  Bill sang back up and lead on a few songs. The music was written by the Youth Pastor and Owen Thomas.  The band's guitar-based sound has been compared to that of groups like the Foo Fighters, Oasis, and even the Beatles.

In 1996, Just Visiting decided to turn their music from a pastime into a career. The band began to tour persistently, performing at shows and festivals all over the United States.

The group recorded their first album that same year, Gardenshow. In 1998, a second album was completed, Just Visiting; both albums were done on independent record labels. "She Never Walked Away," Jug of Pennies, Jesus Loves you '96 "Don't Ever Let Me See You Cry," and "Cast a Stone" are some of the tracks on the albums.

In 1999, the band changed its name from Just Visiting to the Elms,. A few months later, the group signed with Sparrow Records. A self-titled EP (using the new name), The Elms, was released in 2000. One of the tunes on the EP, "Lifeboat," made it as a Top 13 hit nationwide. Over the years, the Elms have performed with many other Christian groups, including the Waiting, Seven Day Jesus, the O.C. Supertones, Big Tent Revival, Sixpence None the Richer, and Delirious? Other members of the Elms have been bassist Jeff Sutton, who added his talents for over two years before leaving; guitarist Billy Riggs, who joined the band for the 1997 Gospel Music Association National Spotlight Competition; Malcolm McLaughlin, who left in 1999; guitarist James Thompson, who was with the group from 1997–2000; and Florida bass guitarist Matt Erickson, who joined in time to work with the Elms on a full-length album for Sparrow. That album was Big Surprise, a sweetly catchy affair that saw the group adding pop elements that had not previously come through in their sound.

A 2002 tour with Peter Frampton and a new album, Truth, Soul, Rock & Roll, marked their next efforts. The group took a long hiatus from both touring and recording, returning in 2006 with Chess Hotel.

Discography 

American Christian musical groups
American pop rock music groups
Musical groups established in 1996